Capon Springs is an unincorporated community in Hampshire County, West Virginia, United States. According to the 2000 census, the Capon Springs community has a population of 95.

It is located on Capon Springs Road (West Virginia Secondary Route 16) along Capon Springs Run. Originally known as Frye's Springs after its discoverer Henry Frye, and later established as the Town of Watson in 1787, the town was renamed for its medicinal spring. The springs were believed to carry such healing power that half an acre sold for $900 in gold in the late 18th century. After West Virginia seceded from Virginia in 1863, it had to pay Virginia for the loss of the springs during Reconstruction. The historic Capon Springs & Farms resort is located here and is listed on the National Register of Historic Places.

Notable people

Herman Guy Kump (1877–1962), 19th Governor of West Virginia, and American educator Arthur R. M. Spaid (1866–1936) were born in Capon Springs.

Historical names 

Capon Springs and its post office have been known by several varying names throughout its history, which include:

Historic sites 
Capon Springs, Capon Springs Road (CR 16)
Octagon House, Capon Springs Road (CR 16)
Old Red Store, Capon Springs Road (CR 16) & McIlwee Road (CR 16/1)
Ms. Bessie's Bungalow, Capon Springs Road (CR 16)

References

Bibliography 
 
Mountain House, Capon Springs, Hampshire County, Virginia. Baltimore, Maryland, The Printing Office, 1857.

External links 

Capon Springs & Farms
George Washington National Forest: Lee Ranger District

Populated places established in 1787
Unincorporated communities in Hampshire County, West Virginia
Spa towns in West Virginia
Unincorporated communities in West Virginia
1787 establishments in Virginia